"Black Magic Woman" is a song written by British musician Peter Green, which first appeared as a single for his band Fleetwood Mac in 1968. Subsequently, the song appeared on the 1969 Fleetwood Mac compilation albums English Rose (US) and The Pious Bird of Good Omen (UK), as well as the later Greatest Hits and Vintage Years compilations. 

In 1970, the song was released as the first single from Santana's album Abraxas. The song, as sung by Gregg Rolie, reached number four on the US and Canadian charts, and its chart success made Santana's recording the better-known version of the song.

The song was also covered by former Fleetwood Mac member Bob Welch on his 2006 album His Fleetwood Mac Years and Beyond, Vol. 2. Although Welch was not a member of the group at the time of the original recording, he had performed a number of Peter Green's songs during his time with the band.

Composition
"Black Magic Woman" was written by Peter Green in 1968, with lyrics inspired by his former girlfriend, Sandra Elsdon, whom Green had nicknamed "Magic Mamma". Green has acknowledged that "Black Magic Woman" was musically influenced by "All Your Love", an Otis Rush song that had been recorded two years earlier by Green's former band, John Mayall & the Bluesbreakers (albeit with Eric Clapton, Green's predecessor, on lead guitar). Green said in Peter Green: The Biography: "One of things [Mayall] said was that if you really like something, you should take the first lines and make up another song from them. So that's what I did with 'Black Magic Woman'."

"Black Magic Woman" is a minor blues with a Latin rhythm first explored in Green's "I Loved Another Woman" in Fleetwood Mac's 1968 self-titled debut album.

Structure
"Black Magic Woman" has the same chord structure, guitar breaks, and even a similar melody to "I Loved Another Woman". Set in the key of D minor, the verse follows a twelve bar chord progression alternating between D minor7, A minor7, and G minor7, and the instrumentation consists of vocals, two guitars, bass guitar and drums. It is homophonic, the voice and lead guitar taking the lead roles. The song is set in common time (4/4), with the rhythm "pushing" on the upbeat, then breaking into a shuffle beat root -chord jam after the final verse.

D minor 7 | D minor 7 | A minor 7 | A minor 7 | D minor 7 | D minor 7 | G minor 7 | G minor 7 | Dm 7 - C 7 | Bb 7 - A 7 | D minor 7 | D minor 7

The original recording by Fleetwood Mac featured guitars that were slightly below standard pitch. Green started the song with a D minor triad down on the 17th fret played on one guitar with vibrato, creating a shimmering effect. A slide guitar playing the same chord is faded in over the top. A slightly distorted solo is played in the middle of the song.

Performance

Fleetwood Mac's "Black Magic Woman" was released as a single in 1968, and reached number 37 on the UK Singles Chart. The song was featured in Fleetwood Mac's live set-lists even after Green had left the band, when it was usually sung by Danny Kirwan. During Fleetwood Mac concerts in the early 1970s, the song would often form the basis for the long-mid concert jams. However, by the 1987's Shake the Cage Tour, performance of "Black Magic Woman" was blocked by John McVie who felt the song too closely linked to Santana. Stevie Nicks performed the song with slight changes in lyrics in the 2018-2019 tour An Evening with Fleetwood Mac.

Peter Green played the song with Santana at the 1998 Rock and Roll Hall of Fame Induction Ceremony where the inductees included both Fleetwood Mac and Santana.

Santana version

Background
Santana's version, recorded in 1970, is a medley with Gábor Szabó's 1966 instrumental "Gypsy Queen", a mix of jazz, Hungarian folk and Latin rhythms. The song became one of Santana's staples and one of their biggest hits, with the single spending 13 weeks on the Billboard Hot 100 chart and peaking at number four in January 1971, their highest-peaking Hot 100 hit until 1999’s "Smooth". Santana's 1970 album, Abraxas, reached no. 1 on the charts and hit quadruple platinum in 1986, partially thanks to "Black Magic Woman".

"Gypsy Queen" was omitted from the single version contained on 1974's Santana's Greatest Hits album, even though radio stations usually play "Black Magic Woman" and "Gypsy Queen" as one song.

Structure
While the song follows the same general structure of Peter Green's version, also set in common time, in D minor and using the same melody and lyrics, it is considerably different, with a slightly altered chord pattern (Dm7– Am7–Dm7–Gm7–Dm7–Am7–Dm7), occasionally mixing between the Dorian and Aeolian modes, especially in the song's intro. A curious blend of blues, rock, jazz, 3/2 afro-Cuban son clave, and "Latin" polyrhythms, Santana's arrangement added conga, timbales and other percussion, in addition to organ and piano, to make complex polyrhythms that give the song a "voodoo" feel distinct from the original.

The introduction of the song, which was adapted from Szabó's "Gypsy Queen", consists of simple hammer-ons, pull-offs and slides on the guitar and bass, before moving into the introductory guitar solo of "Black Magic Woman". After the introductory solo, which follows the same chord progression as the verse, the song moves into an eight-bar piano solo in D minor, and proceeds to two verses sung by keyboardist Gregg Rolie. Two verses of guitar solo follow the two sung verses, which are then succeeded by another verse, before moving into a modified version of the "Gypsy Queen" section from the beginning of the song to end the piece.

There is also a single edit, a slightly shorter version of the song that omits the opening piano solo and the "Gypsy Queen" portion, that runs for 3:15, while some radio versions play the full recording. Other longer versions have since been released, including one version which runs for 8:56.

Charts

References

1968 singles
1968 songs
1970 singles
Fleetwood Mac songs
Music published by Bourne Co. Music Publishers
Santana (band) songs
Epic Records singles
Columbia Records singles
Songs written by Peter Green (musician)